Wolfgang Sieber (born 3 September 1937) is a retired German swimmer who won a bronze medal in the 200 m butterfly at the 1962 European Aquatics Championships. He also competed at the 1960 Summer Olympics in the same event, but was eliminated in the preliminaries.

References

1937 births
German male swimmers
Swimmers at the 1960 Summer Olympics
German male butterfly swimmers
Olympic swimmers of the United Team of Germany
Living people
European Aquatics Championships medalists in swimming
People from Saalfeld
Sportspeople from Thuringia